Robert McCoy (died June 7, 1849) was a member of the U.S. House of Representatives from Pennsylvania.

Robert McCoy born in Carlisle, Pennsylvania (birth date unknown).  He served as prothonotary of Cumberland County, Pennsylvania.  He was a Brigadier General of the militia and a state canal commissioner.

McCoy was elected as a Jacksonian to the Twenty-second Congress to fill the vacancy caused by the death of United States Representative William Ramsey.  He died in Wheeling, Virginia (now West Virginia) in 1849.

Sources

The Political Graveyard

Pennsylvania prothonotaries
1849 deaths
People from Carlisle, Pennsylvania
Year of birth unknown
Jacksonian members of the United States House of Representatives from Pennsylvania
19th-century American politicians